The 1991 NCAA Division I Men's Soccer Tournament was the 32nd organized men's college soccer tournament by the National Collegiate Athletic Association, to determine the top college soccer team in the United States. The Virginia Cavaliers won their second national title by defeating the Santa Clara Broncos in the championship game on penalty kicks after the game ended in a 0–0 tie after four overtime periods. This was a re-match of the 1989 tournament final at Rutgers Stadium when both teams were crowned co-national champions. The final match was played on December 8, 1991, in Tampa, Florida, at USF Soccer Stadium for the second straight year. All the other games were played at the home field of the higher seeded team.

Early rounds

Final

See also  
 NCAA Division II Men's Soccer Championship
 NCAA Division III Men's Soccer Championship
 NAIA Men's Soccer Championship

References 

NCAA Division I Men's Soccer Tournament seasons
NCAA Division I Men's
Sports competitions in Tampa, Florida
NCAA Division I Men's Soccer
NCAA Division I Men's Soccer Tournament
Soccer in Florida